Manana Shapakidze (born 14 September 1989) is a Georgian former professional tennis player.

In her career, she won three singles and three doubles titles on the ITF Circuit. On 17 May 2010, she reached her best singles ranking of world No. 382. On 19 July 2010, she peaked at No. 331 in the doubles rankings.

Playing for Georgia in Fed Cup, Shapakidze has a win–loss record of 1–1.

ITF finals

Singles: 5 (3–2)

Doubles: 8 (3–5)

Fed Cup participation

Doubles

References

External links
 
 
 

1989 births
Living people
Female tennis players from Georgia (country)